Ivan Collendavelloo is a politician from Mauritius who served as Deputy Prime Minister of Mauritius and Vice Prime Minister of Mauritius. He also served as Minister of Energy & Public Utilities. In July 2020, Prime Minister of Mauritius replaced Collendavelloo from his offices because he was involved in corrupt practices.

References 

Mauritian politicians
Year of birth missing (living people)
Living people